Aquilegia grata is a species of Aquilegia native to Serbia, Montenegro and Bosnia. It is a herbaceous perennial plant growing to 0.8 m tall, with branched, thinly hairy stems. The leaves are pinnate, with the basal leaflets themselves trifoliate.

References

grata
Flora of Serbia